John Burton was an Anglican priest in the 19th century. He was the Provost of St Ninian's Cathedral in Perth, Scotland from 1871 to 1885.

References

Scottish Episcopalian clergy
Provosts of St Ninian's Cathedral, Perth